Dawson River, a perennial river of the Manning River catchment, is located in the Mid North Coast district of New South Wales, Australia.

Course and features
Dawson River rises below Mount Goonook within the Gibraltar Range, near Killabakh, and flows generally south by east, before reaching its confluence with the northern passage of the Manning River, at Cundletown. The river descends  over its  course.

See also 

 Rivers of New South Wales
 List of rivers of New South Wales (A–K)
 List of rivers of Australia

References

External links
 

Rivers of New South Wales
Mid North Coast
Mid-Coast Council